Wilfried Kohls (born 12 October 1950) is a German former professional footballer, who played as a goalkeeper, and later manager.

References

1950 births
Living people
German footballers
Kickers Offenbach players
Association football goalkeepers
2. Bundesliga players
German football managers
Kickers Offenbach managers